"Foggy Dew" is the name of several Irish ballads, and of an Irish lament. The song chronicles the Easter Rising of 1916, and encourages Irishmen to fight for the cause of Ireland, rather than for the British Empire, as so many young men were doing in World War I.

Early title
"The Foggy Dew" as the name of an Irish traditional song first appears in Edward Bunting's The Ancient Music of Ireland (1840), where the tune is different from that mostly sung today (also different from the lament and the rebel song below). Bunting's source for the tune was a "J. Mc Knight, Belfast, 1839", but the same melody already appears in O'Farrell's Collection of National Irish Music for the Union Pipes (London, 1804), where it is called "Corraga Bawn".

Easter Rising

Another song called "Foggy Dew" was written by Fr (later Canon) Charles O’Neill from Portglenone, County Antrim (1887–1963), a priest of the Diocese of Down and Connor who was then a curate at St. Peter's Cathedral, Belfast, and later in life was parish priest of Kilcoo and later Newcastle, County Down.    O'Neill was ordained in St. Patrick's College, Maynooth in 1912.

The music is from a manuscript that was in possession of Kathleen Dallat, sister of Michael Dallat of Ballycastle. That manuscript gives Carl Hardebeck as the arranger. It is the same air as the traditional love song The Moorlough Shore.

"The Foggy Dew" is a product of the political situation in Ireland in the aftermath of the Easter Rising and World War I.

Approximately 210,000 Irishmen joined up and served in the British forces during the war. This created mixed feelings for many Irish people, particularly for those with nationalist sympathies. While they broadly supported the British war effort, they also felt that one of the moral justifications for the war, "the freedom of small nations" like Belgium and Serbia, should also be applied to Ireland, which at that time was under British rule. The 1915 Gallipoli slaughter of the young and mainly middle-class Irishmen who had joined up in response to John Redmond's call turned many people against the war.

In 1916, Irish patriots led by James Connolly and Patrick Pearse, taking advantage of Britain being preoccupied by World War I, seized some of the major buildings in Dublin including the General Post Office, while others came out in Ashbourne and Galway in the Easter Rising.

The brutal response to the Rising, and the execution of its leaders that followed, marked a turning point for many Irish people. The public revulsion at the executions added to the growing sense of alienation from the British Government.

Canon O'Neill reflected this alienation when he wrote The Foggy Dew commemorating the few hundred brave men who had risen out against what was then the most powerful empire in the world. In 1919, he attended the first sitting of the new Irish Parliament, Dáil. The names of the elected members were called out, but many were absent. Their names were answered by the reply faoi ghlas ag na Gaill – "locked up by the foreigner".

These events had a profound effect on O'Neill and some time after this he wrote The Foggy Dew telling the story of the Easter Rising and reflecting the thoughts of many Irish people at the time who now believed that the Irishmen who fought for Britain during the war should have stayed home and fought for Irish independence instead.

O'Neill sums up this feeling in the line ‘Twas far better to die ‘neath an Irish sky, Than at Suvla or Sud el Bar‘.

Recording artists
The song (also sometimes known as Down the Glen) has been performed and recorded by many Irish traditional groups, including The Clancy Brothers and Tommy Makem, The Dubliners, The Chieftains, Shane MacGowan and The Wolfe Tones among others.

Sinéad O'Connor provided the vocals for a mournful version of the song on the Chieftains' 1995 collaboration album The Long Black Veil which was voted Best Duet by BBC Radio 6 Music. This version is played often before a concert by Dropkick Murphys. On 11 July 2015, she sang a live rendition of the song for Conor McGregor's entrance at UFC 189 in Las Vegas, Nevada.
Italian band Patricks on the first album "Tales from Irish Waves" (2016).
Dylan Walshe recorded a version live from Cave in Rock.
Alan Stivell on the Olympia live album (1972), and the Again album (1993) (including Shane MacGowan's backing vocals).
Daniele Sepe with his Italian jazz group included Foggy Dew in his album Spiritus Mundi (1995), among many other protest songs from all over the world, with the voice of the Finnish singer Auli Kokko.
Young Dubliners on their album Breathe (1995).
The song "Livin' in America" by the Celtic rock band Black 47 is played and sung to the tune of the Foggy Dew.
Serbian band Orthodox Celts on their second album The Celts Strike Again.
Serbian band Tir na n'Og on their album Tir na n'Og.
Houston-based Celtic rock band Blaggards on their 2005 album "Standards."
Croatian band Belfast Food on Live in Rijeka.
German Celtic metal band Suidakra on the album Lays From Afar (1999) as the album closer. It features only the first verse.
The Screaming Orphans on their album Sliabh Liag (2013).
Pete Seeger recorded this song with his own lyrics, calling it "Over the Hills".
Irish metal band Primordial on the compilation One and All, Together, for Home (2014).
Gilles Servat in a duet with Ronnie Drew, in Servat's album Sur les quais de Dublin (On the Quays of Dublin) (1996) including a verse written by Servat.
Odetta did a version in the early 1960s.
Hamish Imlach on his self-titled album (1966).
Jag Panzer on their 2017 album The Deviant Chord.
Polish folk band Beltaine from their album Rockhill (2004).
Arizona road band Major Lingo on the album Ride (1987).
Scottish-Swedish folkband The Corbies released it on their single Foggy Dew in 2020.
Derek Warfield recorded it in 2008 with The Wolfe Tones
 Liam Clancy published it on his album Irish Troubadour in 2006
 Colm McGuinness published a version to his YouTube channel in 2022
 Brother Bastion often includes a version of the song in his live performances
 The artists Niklas Kleberg and The Darkeyed Musician have published a cover of the song on their channels (Youtube channels: "Hear My Melody" & "The Darkeyed Musician" respectively)

References

External links
 Lyrics guitar chords and video of The Foggy Dew
 An article discussing the origin, performance and reception of The Foggy Dew by an Ethnomusicologist
 A streaming recording at the Library of Congress of a 1913 version sung by John McCormack  

Irish ballads
Irish songs
Irish folk songs